Josimar da Silva Martins simply known as Josimar is a Brazilian footballer who last played for Dempo.

Career

Club
In October 2014, Josimar signed for Mumbai.

In October 2015, Josimar signed for Dempo.

Career statistics

Club

References

External links
 
 Profile at futpedia.globo.com
 Profile at goal.com

Brazilian footballers
1985 births
Living people
Expatriate footballers in India
Brazilian expatriate sportspeople in India
I-League players
Salgaocar FC players
Mohammedan SC (Kolkata) players
Association football forwards